Hoffman Glacier is a narrow glacier,  long, flowing eastward from Mount Miller in the Holland Range of Antarctica to enter Lennox-King Glacier south of Rhodes Peak. It was named by the Advisory Committee on Antarctic Names for Lieutenant Commander Robert D. Hoffman, U.S. Navy, commanding officer of  during Operation Deep Freeze, 1965.

References

Glaciers of Shackleton Coast